Imagine Communications is an Irish internet service provider and telecommunications operator, who provide WiMAX, wireless broadband and resell Eircom telecommunications wholesale packages. The company operates in Ireland, the United Kingdom, the Netherlands, Austria, Norway and the United States.

Services
Imagine briefly operated the first Irish mobile virtual network, "Cellular 3", which bought airtime from Eircell.  A legal challenge ended the arrangement and Imagine exited the mobile market. The "Cellular 3" name was derived from Imagine's de facto position as Ireland's third mobile operator at the time; Meteor Mobile Communications, the third physical operator, had yet to be licensed.

Imagine later became the first company to introduce mobile WiMAX technology to Ireland. As of 2010, the company provides services to 17,000 businesses.

Imagine has affiliations with several brands, including Motorola, HP, and Intel.

Related companies
 Clearwire was acquired by Imagine in 2010 
 Irish Broadband was acquired by Imagine in 2008
 Cinergi Telecom was acquired by Imagine in 2007
 Subsidiary Gaelic Telecom, which donates a percentage of each bill to a customer's selected GAA club or National school
 Access Telecom
 Bandwagon (music portal), partially owned as of 2006
 Open Solutions provides network administration and related services

References

External links
 Official website
 Bloomberg Businessweek profile

Telecommunications companies of the Republic of Ireland
Telecommunications in the Republic of Ireland
Mobile virtual network operators